The Unknown Revolution is a 1947 history of the Russian Revolution by Voline.

Publication 

Voline finished the book in 1940 while in Marseilles. After his death in 1945, it was first published posthumously in 1947.

The book was translated into English in two parts by the Libertarian Book Club. The first volume, Nineteen-Seventeen: The Russian Revolution Betrayed, in 1954, and the second volume, The Unknown Revolution: Kronstadt 1921, Ukraine 1918–21, in 1956.

Reception and legacy 

Historian of anarchism Paul Avrich wrote that Voline's book was "the most important anarchist history of the Russian Revolution in any language".

References

Bibliography

Further reading

External links 

Full text  from Bibliothèque nationale de France
Fredy Perlman's English translation of The Unknown Revolution via Libcom.org
Iain McKay's Introduction to PM Press's 2019 edition of The Unknown Revolution.

1947 non-fiction books
French-language books
History books about anarchism
History books about the Russian Revolution
History books about Ukraine
Kronstadt
Translations into English